Ai Yori Aoshi, a manga series by Kou Fumizuki, was adapted into two anime television series by J.C.Staff directed by Masami Shimoda. Broadcast on Fuji TV, the first season premiered on April 10, 2002, and aired weekly until its conclusion on September 25, 2002, spanning twenty-four episodes. Most of the music for the series was composed by Toshio Masuda. A second, twelve-episode anime television series titled  was broadcast on Fuji TV premiering in October 2003 and running weekly until its conclusion on December 28, 2003. In addition to the two seasons, two bonus episodes were also made, the first of which appeared in season one, titled "Speaking of Dreams", and shows the character's past and current dreams for the future. The second bonus episode (from season two) is a sixteen-minute prelude to the series. It takes place some months before the first episode of Ai Yori Aoshi.

Three pieces of theme music are used in the first season: one opening theme and two ending themes. The opening theme, titled , is performed by Yoko Ishida. The ending theme is  performed by The Indigo. The 18th episode's ending theme is "I'll Be Home" performed by Satsuki Yukino.

The second season used three pieces of theme music: one opening theme and two ending themes. The opening theme,  is once again performed by Yoko Ishida. The ending themes, "I Do!" and "Presence", are both performed by The Indigo.

In Japan, the first season was released across eight Region 2 DVD compilation volumes by Geneon Entertainment, with six compilations consisting of the second season's DVD release. Geneon licensed both seasons of the anime adaptation for English-language dubbed released in North America. The first season was released across five Region 1 DVD compilation volumes between February 23, 2003, and October 14, 2003. A DVD boxset compiling all five volumes was later released by Geneon.

The second season of the anime series was released across three Region 1 DVD compilation volumes between July 6, 2004, and November 9, 2004. A DVD boxset compiling all three volumes and DVDs released for the first season was released by Geneon on April 17, 2007.

Episode list

Ai Yori Yoshi (2002)

Ai Yori Aoshi Enishi (2003)

References

Ai Yori Aoshi
Ai Yori Aoshi